This is a list of Mexican films released in 2014.

References

External links

List of 2014 box office number-one films in Mexico

2014
Films
Mexican